The 2S19 Msta (after the Msta River) is a 152.4 mm self-propelled howitzer designed by the Soviet Union, which entered service in 1989 as the successor to the 2S3 Akatsiya. The vehicle has the running gear of the T-80, but is powered by the T-72's diesel engine.

Development
The Msta is a howitzer designed for deployment either as an unarmored towed gun, or to be fitted in armored self-propelled artillery mountings. Current production of the towed model is designated Msta-B, while the self-propelled model is the Msta-S (also known by the GRAU index 2S19).

Development of the 2S19 started in 1980 under the project name Ferma. The prototype was known as Ob'yekt 316. The 2S19's standard equipment consists of a semi-automatic laying system 1P22, an automatic loader, an NBC protection system, passive night vision device for the driver, a vehicle snorkel, a dozer blade, a smoke generator and 81mm smoke launchers, 1V116 intercom system and a 16 kW generator AP-18D. In 2008 the Russian armed forces ordered an improved model with an automated fire control system.

Operational use
Msta-S howitzers were used by Russian Army to deliver artillery strikes against Chechen separatists during the Second Chechen War.

Msta-S howitzers have been used in the Russo-Ukrainian War by the Ukrainian Army as well as pro-Russian separatists who captured one machine during the conflict.

Operators

Current operators
  – 18
  – 12
  – 10
  – 1
  – Received an undisclosed number of Msta-S.
  – Approximately 760 in service (including over 260 2S19M1 and over 210 2S19M2) and 270 more stored as of 2020. More Msta-SMs are being delivered.
  – 40, plus at least 34 2S19 Msta-S and 16 2S33 Msta-SM2 captured from Russia.
  – 48

Russia recently offered its Msta-S 152 mm Howitzer to foreign countries, particularly in the Middle East. A demonstration was organised in 2020 by Rosoboronexport, the country's nodal agency for arms export, for representatives from various Middle Eastern countries.

Former operators

Specifications
Msta-S specifications provided by manufacturer
 Range:
 24.7 km (15.3 mi) standard round
 28.9 km (18 mi) base-bleed
 36 km (22 mi) rocket-assisted
 Rate of fire: 6–8 rounds per minute
 Weapon elevation: −4° to +68°
 Weapon traverse: 360°
 Deployment time: 22 minutes
 Unit of fire: 50 rounds

Variants
 152 mm howitzer 2A65 – a towed version of the same gun.
 1K17 Szhatie – a "laser tank" armed with a battery of lasers meant to disable optoelectronic systems; based on the Msta-S.
 2S19M1 (unveiled in 2000, first deliveries in 2007) – Improved fire-control system and added GLONASS antenna. Modernised V-84AMS engine.
 2S19M2 or 2S33 "Msta-SM2" (2013) – Improved version currently in production equipped with a new automatic fire control system which increases the rate of fire. Digital electronic maps are now available which significantly speeds up the terrain orientation in difficult geographical conditions and allows performing faster and more efficiently firing missions. Russians say that its range is up to 80 km.
 2S19M1-155 (2006) – 155 mm export version of the 2S19M1, fitted with an L/52 gun with a range of more than 40 km. Modernized in 2020. A modernized version for hot climates has been tested in India as of August 2022.
 2S21 "Msta-K" – Wheeled variant, based on an eight-wheel truck chassis. It used the 2A67 gun, a variant of the 2A65 modified for use from wheeled platforms. There were several different prototypes, including one based on the Ural-5323 and one on the KrAZ-6316. The project was abandoned in 1987.
 2S19M (also known as 2S30 "Iset" and 2S33 "Msta-SM") – Project for a version with improved range and rate of fire, easier maintenance and optimised manufacturing process. Started between the 1990s and the early 2000s, but quickly abandoned in favor of the 2S35 Koalitsiya-SV.
 2S35 "Koalitsiya-SV" – Project for a new artillery system for the Russian land forces (SV stands for "sukhoputniye voyska"). Early prototypes consisted of a 2S19 chassis with modified turret, fitted with an over-and-under dual autoloaded 152 mm howitzer. Development of this variant was abandoned in favour of an entirely new artillery system using the same designation.

Similar vehicles
 2S3 Akatsiya
 2S35 Koalitsiya-SV
 AHS Krab
 AMX-30 AuF1
 AS-90
 K-9 Thunder
 M109
 Panzerhaubitze 2000
 PLZ-05
 PLZ-45
 T-155 Fırtına
 Type 99 155 mm self-propelled howitzer

References

External links
 
 2S19 152-mm Self-Propelled Howitzer
 152-mm Self-propelled Howitzer 2S19 "MSTA-S"
 Arms Systems Page

Cold War artillery of the Soviet Union
Howitzers of Russia
Self-propelled howitzers of the Soviet Union
Self-propelled artillery of Russia
152 mm artillery
Tracked self-propelled howitzers
Self-propelled artillery of the Cold War
Uraltransmash products
Military vehicles introduced in the 1980s